Esteban José Herrera is an Argentine football centre forward. He was born on March 9, 1981, in the city of Villa Constitucion in the Santa Fe Province of  Argentina. His last team was Atlético Camioneros in the Torneo Argentino B.

Herrera started his career at Boca Juniors in the Primera Division Argentina. It was with Boca that he won his first and second major titles as a player. He was part of the squad that won the Clausura 1999 title and in 2001 he helped Boca to win the Copa Libertadores title.

In 2001 Herrera was part of the Argentina Under-20 team that won the 2001 FIFA World Youth Championship.

At the end of the 2001 season Herrera left Boca for Talleres de Córdoba but after only one season with the club he moved to Italy to play for F.C. Messina Peloro.

Honours

Club honors
Boca Juniors
Argentine Primera División (1): Clausura 1999
Copa Libertadores (1): 2001

Country honors
Argentina U-20
FIFA World Youth Championship (1): 2001

External links
 
 
 
 

1981 births
Living people
Argentine footballers
Argentine expatriate footballers
Association football forwards
Boca Juniors footballers
A.C.R. Messina players
Talleres de Córdoba footballers
Chacarita Juniors footballers
Coronel Bolognesi footballers
Iraklis Thessaloniki F.C. players
Veria F.C. players
OFI Crete F.C. players
Ñublense footballers
Argentine Primera División players
Serie B players
Super League Greece players
Expatriate footballers in Chile
Expatriate footballers in Greece
Expatriate footballers in Italy
Expatriate footballers in Peru
People from Constitución Department
Argentine expatriate sportspeople in Greece
Argentine expatriate sportspeople in Italy
Sportivo Italiano footballers
S.S.D. Lucchese 1905 players
Argentina under-20 international footballers
Expatriate footballers in Indonesia
Mitra Kukar players
Liga 1 (Indonesia) players
Sportspeople from Santa Fe Province